The Martin 29 is a Canadian sailboat that was designed by Don Martin as an International Offshore Rule Half Ton class racer-cruiser and first built in 1972.

Production
The design was built by Cooper Enterprises in Port Coquitlam, British Columbia, starting in 1972, but the company went out of business in 1990 and the boat out of production.

Design
The Martin 29 is a recreational keelboat, built predominantly of fibreglass, with wood trim. It has a masthead sloop rig, a raked stem, an internally mounted spade-type rudder and a fixed fin keel. It displaces  and carries  of ballast.

Operational history
The boat is supported by an active class club that organizes racing events, the Half Ton Class.

See also
List of sailing boat types

References

Keelboats
1970s sailboat type designs
Sailing yachts 
Trailer sailers
Sailboat type designs by Don Martin
Sailboat types built by Cooper Enterprises